John Lafayette Pearson III (March 7, 1926 – June 30, 2021) was an American judge and politician who served in the Mississippi House of Representatives and as mayor of Rosedale, Mississippi. A nephew of Speaker Walter Sillers Jr., Pearson was elected to the House in 1966 when Sillers died in 1966.

Personal life
Pearson married the former Katherine Myres in 1955. They live in the house his grandfather, Walter Sillers, built, which is on the National Register of Historic Places.

References

1926 births
2021 deaths
Mississippi lawyers
People from Rosedale, Mississippi
Democratic Party members of the Mississippi House of Representatives
20th-century American lawyers
20th-century American politicians
University of Mississippi alumni